Fazilat Metro Station is a station on Shiraz Metro Line 1 along Modares Boulevard. There are several institutional places of interests and the Natural History museum nearby.

References

Shiraz Metro stations
Railway stations opened in 2017